Plachetka is a surname. Notable people with the surname include:

Adam Plachetka (born 1985), Czech bass-baritone
Ján Plachetka (born 1945), Slovak chess grandmaster
Ľudovít Plachetka (born 1971), Slovak boxer

Czech-language surnames
Slovak-language surnames